Claire Colwill (born 19 September 2003) is a field hockey player from Australia, who plays as a defender.

Personal life
Claire Colwill was born and raised in Mackay, Queensland.

Career

Domestic league
In 2019, Colwill was a member of the Brisbane Blaze squad for the inaugural season of the Sultana Bran Hockey One League.

National teams

Under–21
Claire Colwill made her debut for the Australia U–21 team in 2020 during a test series against Japan in Canberra.

Hockeyroos
Colwill was named in the Hockeyroos squad for the first time in 2022, after impressing at a series of selection camps. She made her senior international debut in May that year, during the Trans–Tasman Hockey Series in Auckland.

References

External links
 
 
 

2003 births
Living people
Australian female field hockey players
Female field hockey defenders
21st-century Australian women
Field hockey players at the 2022 Commonwealth Games
Commonwealth Games silver medallists for Australia
Commonwealth Games medallists in field hockey
People from Mackay, Queensland
Sportswomen from Queensland
Medallists at the 2022 Commonwealth Games